Hugo Peus (7 September 1809 – 13 July 1898) was a German jurist and politician.

Life

Peus, son of Friedrich Peus and father of H. Busso Peus, studied law at Humboldt University of Berlin. Following his father, he became a solicitor and barrister and notary in Recklinghausen and was subsequently appointed Royal Prussian Legal Counsel (Königlich Preußischer Justizrat) by the King of Prussia.

Peus was a member of the City Council of Recklinghausen. From 1851 to 1852 he served as Acting Mayor of the City of Recklinghausen.

In 1881, he was appointed honorary citizen of Recklinghausen.

References

Literature

Preussisches Staatsministerium: Handbuch über den Königlich Preussischen Hof und Staat, 

Jurists from North Rhine-Westphalia
1809 births
1898 deaths
Humboldt University of Berlin alumni
People from Recklinghausen
Mayors of places in North Rhine-Westphalia